The 14th European Athletics Championships were held from 26 to 31 August 1986 at the Neckarstadion, now known as Mercedes-Benz Arena, in Stuttgart, a city in West Germany.  Contemporaneous reports on the event were given in the Glasgow Herald.

Men's results
Complete results were published.

Track
1978 | 1982 | 1986 | 1990 | 1994

Field
1978 | 1982 | 1986 | 1990 | 1994

Women's results

Track
1978 | 1982 | 1986 | 1990 | 1994

Field
1978 | 1982 | 1986 | 1990 | 1994

All the medals All the medals
https://www.youtube.com/watch?v=Z1dLKh0aH1U&list=PLK1QYHf4OvhN6ydKbmo2wLecwCOef15SL

Medal table

Participation
According to an unofficial count, 878 athletes from 31 countries participated in the event, 28 athletes less than the official number of 906 as published. 

 (17)
 (20)
 (34)
 (6)
 (29)
 (17)
 (65)
 (31)
 (59)
 (1)
 (6)
 (24)
 (3)
 (12)
 (47)
 (2)
 (2)
 (1)
 (16)
 (30)
 (34)
 (21)
 (16)
 (98)
 (33)
 (49)
 (26)
 (6)
 (79)
 (82)
 (12)

See also
1986 in athletics (track and field)

Notes
Differences to competition format since the 1982 European Championships:

New events added: 
Women's 20 km walk replaces the 10 km walk .
Women's 10 000m.

References 

 EAA
 Athletix

 
European Athletics Championships
European Athletics Championships
Sports competitions in Stuttgart
European Athletics Championships
1986 in European sport
International athletics competitions hosted by West Germany
20th century in Baden-Württemberg
August 1986 sports events in Europe
20th century in Stuttgart